Zhem, Kazakhstan, (Jem) is a town in Aktobe Region of Kazakhstan. Population:  
Zhem, lying a short distance to the south of Embi, was a former military installation known as Emba-5 (or Embi-5) before it was granted town status.

References

Populated places in Aktobe Region